Balakirev Glacier is an Antarctic glacier flowing northeast into Schubert Inlet from the south part of the Walton Mountains, Alexander Island. It was named by the USSR Academy of Sciences, in 1987, after Mily Balakirev, the Russian composer.

See also
 List of glaciers in the Antarctic
 Glaciology
 Alyabiev Glacier
 Asafiev Glacier
 Wubbold Glacier

References
 

Glaciers of Alexander Island